Waterfront Lady is a 1935 American film directed by Joseph Santley.

Premise
When a young man is befriended by a gambling ship operator and made a partner in the business, he becomes involved in a police manhunt after he covers up a murder committed by his new partner.

Cast 
Ann Rutherford as Joan O'Brien
Frank Albertson as Ronny Hillyer aka Bill
J. Farrell MacDonald as Capt. O'Brien
Barbara Pepper as Gloria Vance
Charles C. Wilson as Jim McFee aka Mac
Grant Withers as Tod
Purnell Pratt as Dist. Atty. Shaw
Jack La Rue as Tom Burden
Ward Bond as Jess
Paul Porcasi as Tony Spadaloni
Mary Gordon as Mrs. O'Flaherty
Mathilde Comont as Mrs. Spadaloni
Robert Emmett O'Connor as Police Lieutenant
Clarence Wilson as Truant Officer
Victor Potel as Alex
Wally Albright as Mickey O'Flaherty
Smiley Burnette as Musician
Naomi Judge as Mrs. DeLacy
Norma Taylor as Blonde Casino Patron

Soundtrack 
 "Deep Dark River" (Music and Lyrics by Smiley Burnette)
 "What I Wouldn't Do" (Music and Lyrics by Smiley Burnette)

Production notes
 This film marked Ann Rutherford's feature film debut, although she had previously appeared in the Mascot serial The Fighting Marines. 
 Portions of the following sea shanties were heard in the film: "Blow the Man Down," "Boney Was a Warrior," "Whiskey Johnnie," "Amsterdam" and "Rolling Home." 
 Portions of this film were shot off the San Pedro harbor in California.

External links 

1935 films
1935 crime drama films
American black-and-white films
American crime drama films
Films about gambling
Mascot Pictures films
Films produced by Nat Levine
Films directed by Joseph Santley
1930s English-language films
1930s American films